Olga Efimova (born 6 January 1990) is a Russian volleyball player, who plays as an outside hitter.

She is a member of the Russia women's national volleyball team and participated at the 2015 FIVB Volleyball Women's World Cup in Japan.
At club level she played for VC Zarechie Odintsovo in 2015.

References

External links
FIVB profile
Profile at CEV

1990 births
Living people
Russian women's volleyball players
20th-century Russian women
21st-century Russian women